Waddell may refer to:

Places 

 Waddell, Arizona
 New Waddell Dam, on the Agua Fria River
 Waddell Barnes Botanical Gardens, Macon, Georgia
 Waddell Creek, a stream in California
 E. E. Waddell Language Academy, Charlotte, North Carolina
 Waddells Mill Pond Site, an archeological site in Florida
 Waddell's Station, a historic site in Oklahoma

Other uses 

 Waddell (surname), including a list of people with the name
 Russell, Majors and Waddell, a partnership that operated the Pony Express
 USS Waddell (DDG-24), a United States Navy vessel
 Waddell and Reed, a mutual fund company
 Waddell (Limited), owners of Dazed & Confused (magazine)
 Waddell's signs, medical terminology related to back pain